Bearmans was a small department store located in Leytonstone, London.

History 
In 1898, Frank Bearman a 27-year-old draper opened a shop on the north side of Leytonstone High Street on the site of a former vicarage. By 1906 the business had purchased a nearby furniture shop, and in 1910 opened an arcade to match the larger department stores in London. Between 1908 and 1921, Frank Bearman jointly owned with J W Holdron, a store owner in Peckham, the Croydon department store Allders.

During the Second World War the store survived the Blitz, and in 1957 expanded again by building a store extension in Kirkdale Road, which Bearmans claimed had the first Escalators outside London.

In 1956 Frank Bearman died, and with increased competition in the area, in 1956 the Bearman Store started Lord Brummell; a high-end bespoke line to create more business. The company was sold to the London Co-operative Society for £1 million in 1962. The Co-operative continued to run the store until 1982 when they closed the operation. The building was demolished and replaced, and is now home to Matalan. A Blue Plaque has been placed on the outside of the new building reminding people of Bearmans by the Leyton & Leytonstone Historical Society.

References

Defunct department stores of the United Kingdom
Defunct retail companies of the United Kingdom
Retail companies established in 1898
Shops in London
Leytonstone
1898 establishments in England
History of the London Borough of Waltham Forest